John Blackmore  was an English politician who sat in the House of Commons in 1654.

Blackmore was the son of John Blackmore of Exeter, Devon. He matriculated at Exeter College, Oxford on 12 December 1634, aged 18. He was awarded BA on 16 January 1640 and MA on 19 May 1649 when he was a major in the army.

In 1654, Blackmore was elected Member of Parliament for Tiverton in the First Protectorate Parliament, but the election was declared void. He sat instead for the combined seat of East Looe and West Looe. 
 
Blackmore is said to have been knighted by Oliver Cromwell. He was Sheriff of Devon in 1657 or 1658

References

 

Members of the pre-1707 English Parliament for constituencies in Cornwall
Alumni of Exeter College, Oxford
Members of the Parliament of England for Tiverton
High Sheriffs of Devon
Year of birth missing
English MPs 1654–1655
Year of death missing